45 Eridani is a single star located around 700 light years away from the Sun in the equatorial constellation of Eridanus. It is visible to the naked eye as a faint, orange-hued star with an apparent visual magnitude of 4.91. This body is moving away from the Earth with a heliocentric radial velocity of +15 km/s.

The stellar classification for this star is K0/1 III, which indicates this is an aging K-type giant star that has exhausted the hydrogen supply at its core and expanded. It has reached 50 times the Sun's radius and is radiating 788 times the luminosity of the Sun from its swollen photosphere at an effective temperature of 4,322 K.

References 

K-type giants
Eridanus (constellation)
Durchmusterung objects
Eridani, 39
026846
019777
1318